Blue Marlin and her sister ship  comprise the Marlin class of semisubmersible heavy-lift ships operated by Dockwise Shipping of the Netherlands. Designed to transport very large, semisubmersible drilling rigs above the transport ship's deck, she is equipped with 38 cabins to accommodate 60 people, a workout room, sauna and swimming facilities, and a secure citadel for protection against pirate attacks.

History 
Blue Marlin and her sister ship were owned by Offshore Heavy Transport of Oslo, Norway, from their construction, in April 2000 and November 1999, respectively, until 6 July 2001, when they were purchased by Dockwise. The U.S. Navy hired Blue Marlin from Offshore Heavy Transport to move the destroyer  back to the United States after the warship was damaged by Al-Qaeda suicide bombers while anchored in the port of Aden, Yemen. During the latter part of 2003, work done on Blue Marlin boosted her capacity and added two retractable propulsors to improve maneuverability. The ship re-entered service in January 2004. Following these improvements, Blue Marlin delivered the oil platform Thunder Horse PDQ, weighing 60,000 tons, to Corpus Christi, Texas, for completion.

In July 2005 Blue Marlin moved the gas refinery Snøhvit from its construction site in Cádiz to Hammerfest, an 11-day trip. This transport was filmed for the TV show Extreme Engineering on the Discovery Channel, and also the TV show Mega Movers on the History Channel.

In November 2005, Blue Marlin left Corpus Christi to move the massive sea-based X-band Radar to Adak, Alaska, via the southern tip of South America and Pearl Harbor, Hawaii. It arrived at Pearl Harbor on 9 January 2006, having travelled 15,000 miles. In January 2007, the Blue Marlin was employed to move two jackup rigs, the Rowan Gorilla VI and the GlobalSantaFe Galaxy II, from Halifax Harbour to the North Sea.

On 16 June 2012, the ship arrived in Ferrol Harbour in preparation for transporting the incomplete amphibious warship  to Melbourne. The Australian ship was lifted onto Blue Marlin on 4 August 2012 and was scheduled to sail on 12 August, bound for Australia BAE Systems shipyard in Williamstown. The ship passed the Port Phillip Heads and arrived at Melbourne on 17 October 2012.

On 5 May 2019, Blue Marlin was briefly hijacked off the coast of Equatorial Guinea. The crew took shelter in the ship's citadel, while pirates shot up the bridge in frustration. The pirates fled before the arrival of the Equatorial Guinean frigate  and Spanish patrol boat .

Post-2004 
Max sailing draft: 
Max draft submerged: 	 
Water above deck submerged
aft 
forward 
Propulsor output:  each
Conversion yard: Hyundai Mipo Dockyard, Ulsan, South Korea

See also
BOKA Vanguard
Mighty Servant 1
Mighty Servant 2
Mighty Servant 3
Semi-submersible

References

External links

 Professional photographs from shipspotting.com
 RIGZONE article about towing the Thunder Horse PDQ oil platform

1999 ships
Heavy lift ships
Semi-submersibles
Ships built in the Republic of China